Thurmond Clarke (June 29, 1902 – February 28, 1971) was a United States district judge of the United States District Court for the Southern District of California and the United States District Court for the Central District of California.

Education and career

Born in Santa Paula, California, Clarke graduated from Los Angeles High School and received a Bachelor of Laws from the USC Gould School of Law in 1927. He was a deputy district attorney of Los Angeles County, California from 1927 to 1929, and then a deputy city attorney of the City of Los Angeles from 1929 to 1932. He was a Judge of the Los Angeles Municipal Court from 1932 to 1935, appointed by Governor James Rolph and was elevated to the Superior Court of Los Angeles County by Governor Frank Merriam, serving in that position from 1935 to 1955.

Federal judicial service

Clarke was nominated by President Dwight D. Eisenhower on June 21, 1955, to the United States District Court for the Southern District of California, to a new seat authorized by 68 Stat. 8. He was confirmed by the United States Senate on August 1, 1955, and received his commission on August 3, 1955. He served as Chief Judge in 1966. Clarke was reassigned by operation of law to the United States District Court for the Central District of California on September 18, 1966, to a new seat authorized by 80 Stat. 75. He served as Chief Judge from 1966 to 1970. In July 1970 at La Casa Pacifica he swore James Day Hodgson into office as Secretary of Labor for the Nixon administration. Clarke assumed senior status on September 1, 1970.

His sentencing practices were criticized as unorthodox and lenient by other judges, such as his predecessor Chief Judge Peirson Hall.

Personal life 
Thurmond Clarke was the son of Judge Robert M. Clarke. After divorcing in 1937, he married again in 1944 to Athalie Richardson Irvine, who was his high school classmate. He was father to Frances and stepfather to Joan Irvine Smith.

References

California state court judges
1902 births
1971 deaths
Judges of the United States District Court for the Central District of California
Judges of the United States District Court for the Southern District of California
People from Santa Paula, California
United States district court judges appointed by Dwight D. Eisenhower
20th-century American judges
USC Gould School of Law alumni